Gilbert Russell may refer to:

 Gilbert Byng Alwyne Russell (1875–1942), British banker and military man
 Val Rosing (1910–1969), British dance band singer, also known as Gilbert Russell
 Gilbert C. Russell (1782–1861), American military officer